Bokhdi Amusement Park was an amusement park in Sheberghan, Afghanistan. After Sheberghan was captured by the Taliban in 2021, videos showing Taliban fighters riding bumper cars and a merry-go-round went viral on Twitter. However, it was burned down a day later due to the presence of statues and idols in the park, which are prohibited in Islam.

Notes 

Amusement parks in Afghanistan
Jowzjan Province
Defunct amusement parks